Ziriano (Zirao in Basque or Ciriano in Spanish) is a village in Álava, Basque Country, Spain.

Populated places in Álava